Ömer Berke Tokaç (born 26 November 2000) is a Turkish professional footballer who plays as a forward for Tochigi SC.

Career statistics

Club

References

External links
 
 

2000 births
Living people
German people of Turkish descent
Turkish footballers
German footballers
Association football forwards
Turkey youth international footballers
J1 League players
J3 League players
Bayer 04 Leverkusen players
Shonan Bellmare players
Fukushima United FC players
German expatriate footballers
German expatriate sportspeople in Japan
Expatriate footballers in Japan